The 2018–19 season was the fifth season in Kerala Blasters FC's existence, as well as their fifth season in Indian Super League.

Review and events

Indian Super League

Kerala Blasters started their 2018–19 Hero Indian Super League campaign with a 0–2 victory over ATK. But the Hero ISL 2018–19 was a disastrous campaign for Kerala Blasters as they finished the season in 9th place in the table.

Super Cup

The team's performance in the Super Cup was also well below as that of expected. They were eliminated in the qualification round by Indian Arrows.

Players

First-team squad

Players In

Players Out

Statistics

Squad appearances and goals

|-
! colspan=10 style=background:#dcdcdc; text-align:center| Goalkeepers

|-
! colspan=10 style=background:#dcdcdc; text-align:center| Defenders

|-
! colspan=10 style=background:#dcdcdc; text-align:center| Midfielders

|-
! colspan=10 style=background:#dcdcdc; text-align:center| Forwards

|}

Squad statistics

Players Used: Kerala Blasters has used a total of 23 different players in all competitions.

Goalscorers

Clean sheets

Disciplinary record

Pre-season and friendlies

Kerala Blasters started their pre season in July in Ahmedabad to prepare for a competition called Toyota Yaris La Liga World. They faced Melbourne City FC from Australia and Spanish club Girona FC in the competition. They suffered heavy losses by Australian club 0–6 and Spanish club 0–5.

In September 2018, Kerala started their second phase of pre season before Indian Super League in Thailand. Where they played some friendly matches with local clubs.

Competitions

Overview

Indian Super League

Standings

Results summary

Results by round

Matchday

See also
 2018–19 in Indian football

References

External links
Official website

Kerala Blasters FC seasons
Kerala Blasters FC